The men's 10,000 metres at the 1969 European Athletics Championships was held in Athens, Greece, at Georgios Karaiskakis Stadium on 16 September 1969.

Medalists

Results

Final
16 September

Participation
According to an unofficial count, 16 athletes from 10 countries participated in the event.

 (1)
 (1)
 (1)
 (3)
 (2)
 (1)
 (1)
 (1)
 (3)
 (2)

References

10000 metres
10,000 metres at the European Athletics Championships
Marathons in Greece